Reflections in Blue is an album by the drummer Art Blakey and the Jazz Messengers, recorded in 1978 in the Netherlands and released on the Dutch Timeless label.

Reception

Allmusic awarded the album 3 stars stating that "The 1978 Jazz Messengers was one of Art Blakey's strongest groups in years, although it would soon be overshadowed by its successor."

Track listing 
All compositions by James Williams except as indicated
 "Reflections in Blue" - 4:45   
 "E.T.A." (Bobby Watson) - 4:54   
 "Say, Dr. "J"" - 8:57   
 "Mishima" (David Schnitter) - 6:37   
 "My Foolish Heart" (Victor Young, Ned Washington) - 3:50   
 "My One and Only Love" (Guy Wood, Robert Mellin) - 5:20   
 "Ellington Medley: Chelsea Bridge/In a Sentimental Mood" (Billy Strayhorn/Duke Ellington) - 9:50   
 "Stretching" - 5:10

Personnel 
Art Blakey - drums
Valery Ponomarev - trumpet
Bobby Watson - alto saxophone
David Schnitter - tenor saxophone
James Williams - piano
Dennis Irwin - double bass

References 

Art Blakey albums
The Jazz Messengers albums
1979 albums
Timeless Records albums